Karen Khachanov was the defending champion but chose not to participate.

Malek Jaziri won the title after defeating Dudi Sela 1–6, 6–1, 6–0 in the final.

Seeds

Draw

Finals

Top half

Bottom half

References
Main Draw
Qualifying Draw

Amex-Istanbul Challenger - Singles